The 2003 Nigerian Senate election in Kwara State was held on April 12, 2003, to elect members of the Nigerian Senate to represent Kwara State. Ahmed Mohammed Inuwa representing Kwara North and Gbemisola Ruqayyah Saraki representing Kwara Central won on the platform of Peoples Democratic Party, while Suleiman Ajadi representing Kwara South won on the platform of the All Nigeria Peoples Party.

Overview

Summary

Results

Kwara North 
The election was won by Ahmed Mohammed Inuwa of the Peoples Democratic Party.

Kwara Central 
The election was won by Gbemisola Ruqayyah Saraki of the Peoples Democratic Party.

Kwara South 
The election was won by Suleiman Ajadi of the All Nigeria Peoples Party.

References 

April 2003 events in Nigeria
Kwara State Senate elections
Kwa